Zornitsa is a village in Sredets Municipality, in Burgas Province, in southeastern Bulgaria.

Zornitsa Cove in Livingston Island in the South Shetland Islands, Antarctica, is named after Zornitsa.

References

Villages in Burgas Province